Humanity+ (also Humanity Plus; formerly the World Transhumanist Association) is a non-profit international educational organization that advocates the ethical use of technologies and evidence-based science to improve the human condition. This condition includes the health of physiological and neurological functions affected by aging and disease, the ecological health and well-being for all life forms, and the future advancements for a more human humanity. Its work includes:

 Producing conferences and summits.
 Incubating foresight strategies for society, culture, and the future.
 Sponsoring prizes.
 Providing education on healthy longevity, ecology and diversity.

The organization was named to identify with meaning more than human, beyond conditions that inhibit intelligence and toward a more humble, creative, and human humanity. It was originally conceived to reach transhumanists throughout the world.

Leadership
Humanity+ is a 501(c)(3) nonprofit international educational organization with a membership, Board of Directors, and Executive Director. The current Board of Directors include Chair Ben Goertzel, Vice Chair José Cordeiro, Secretary Nell Watson, Treasurer Amy Li, Legal Advisor Paul Spiegel, Gabriel Rothblatt, and Didier Coeurnelle. 

The leadership of Humanity+ is its Executive Director Natasha Vita-More, who leads the foresight and vision of the organization, decision making strategies, coordination of the Board, and the day-to-day operations.

History

Humanity+, Inc. originated as an organization under the name World Transhumanist Association. In 1998, the World Transhumanist Association (WTA) was founded by Nick Bostrom and David Pearce. In 2002, it was incorporated as a 501(c)(3) non-profit corporation. WTA began working toward the recognition of transhumanism as a legitimate subject of scientific inquiry and public policy, and to add to the academic presence already created by Extropy Institute in the fields of computer science, AI, nanotechnology, and philosophy.

At its inception, WTA officials considered that social forces could undermine their futurist visions and needed to be addressed. A particular concern is the equal access to human enhancement technologies across classes and borders.

In 2006, William Saletan reported a political struggle within World Transhumanist Association that erupted in 2004 largely between the libertarian right and the liberal left resulting in a centre-leftward positioning that continued to polarize politics under its former executive director James Hughes.

In 2008, as part of a rebranding effort, the WTA changed its leadership and rebranded its corporate name to "Humanity+" in order to disassociate from political turmoil, to project a more humane image and to include a more diverse expression of transhumanism. The official name change was filed with the Secretary of state and its Articles of Incorporation were amended in 2011.

Over the past two decades, Humanity+ leadership has worked to be more inclusive of diverse ideological, political, and religious views that support its mission, as well as diverse ethnicities, sexualities, and other positions that may cause bias and prejudice. It has become less focused on politics and more focused on longevity, social issues including diversity and plurality, the larger issues concerning the ecosystem. The past two decades have developed conferences under the title of H+ Summit and Humanity+ @ Beijing, Harvard, Parsons The New School of Design and Caltech. The 2020 H+ Summit 2020 was a virtual online event, with over 3,000 people in attendance. Humanity+ continues to co-host and sponsor the global TransVision conferences.

Programs and activities

Conferences and summits 
The Humanity+ Conferences, H+ Summits, and TransVision conferences are held throughout the world. In 2011 New York City was the host, in 2012 San Francisco, in 2018, Beijing, in 2019, London, and 2021 Madrid.

Incubating foresight strategies for society, culture, and the future 
The H+ Academy, established in 2020 is an opportunity to face the world's issues with leading thinkers of AI, Philosophy, Economics, Science and the Arts. Roundtable discussions include "Going Meta with the Brain", "Brain Enhancements and Rights", "Future Economics", and "Worldview & Culture of the Future".

Transhumanist Studies is an educational program sponsored by non-financial support by Humanity+. The program launched its first course in 2021 "Introduction to Transhumanism". The program examines the primary ideas on human evolution, social change, emerging technologies, longevity sciences, healthy ecology, and the future potential of humanity that reaches across science, technology, philosophy, ethics and the arts, to develop a practical approach responsive to changes that are occurring.

"Humanity+", as a newly branded organization, launched H+ Magazine, a quarterly magazine on transhumanist news and ideas that has since changed its organization, leadership, and format several times. The magazine produced five issues from 2008 through 2009, each released as PDF-based digital editions, and one released also as a print edition available in retail stores. The publisher changed from Humanity+ to Betterhumans LLC beginning with the second issue, with R. U. Sirius the editor of all five issues. In 2010, with R. U. Sirius continuing as editor, the magazine transitioned into a web-only publication not based around complete issues, and its publisher was switched back to Humanity+. Notable contributors included Michael Moorcock, Rudy Rucker, Woody Evans, John Shirley, James Hughes, and Douglas Rushkoff. H+ Magazine is no longer actively publishing articles and is now an archive of articles written about the future.

Prizes 
The Uplift Prize was launched in 2013 with the winner Quentin Harley for his "Morgan" machine.

The H+ Essay Prize launched in 2018 with "Mutual Benefits of Blockchain and Transhumanism" with three winners.

The H+ Video Prize featured three prizes with "Awakening" receiving first place. 

The H+ Innovator Award was launched in 2021 to looks into our community and acknowledges ideas and projects that encourage social change and author unique narratives. There were three winners: Steve Hill – lifespan.io; Dinorah Delfin – Immortalists Magazine; and Mirko Ranieri – Google AR.

Education on longevity, ecology and diversity 
 to support discussion and public awareness of emerging technologies; 
 to defend the right of individuals in free and democratic societies to adopt technologies that expand human capacities; 
 to anticipate and propose solutions for the potential consequences of emerging technologies;
 to actively encourage and support the development of emerging technologies judged to have sufficiently probable positive benefit.

Advisors and members 

 Nick Bostrom
 David Pearce
 Natasha Vita-More
 George Dvorsky
 Giulio Prisco
 James Hughes
 Mark Alan Walker
 Aubrey de Grey
 Max More
 Ben Goertzel
 Patri Friedman
 R. U. Sirius
 Martine Rothblatt
 Linda MacDonald Glenn
 Giuseppe Vatinno

References

External links
 

501(c)(3) organizations
Non-profit organizations based in California
Transhumanist organizations